TSS Curraghmore was a twin screw steamer passenger vessel operated by the London and North Western Railway from 1919 to 1923, and the London, Midland and Scottish Railway from 1923 to 1935.

History
She was built by William Denny and Brothers of Dumbarton and launched in 1919. She had been laid down in 1914 but her completion and delivery was delayed by the First World War.

In 1930 she was transferred to Heysham and renamed Duke of Abercorn. In 1935 she was scrapped.

References

1919 ships
Ships built on the River Clyde
Passenger ships of the United Kingdom
Ships of the London and North Western Railway
Steamships of the United Kingdom